Line 5 of the Tianjin Metro is a rapid transit line running semi-circular from north-west to south-west Tianjin.
It is run by Tianjin Binhai Mass Transit Development Co., Ltd, which becomes a subsidiary of Tianjin Rail Transit Group Corporation since 2017.

The line is 34.8 km in length and has 28 stations. Beichenkejiyuanbei is half-underground. Liqizhuangnan is at-grade. All other stations are underground. The line uses 6 car B size trains. Line 5, together with Line 6 forms a loop around Tianjin.

Opening timeline
On 22 October 2018, the section from Danhebeidao to Zhongyiyifuyuan (26 stations) became operational. On 31 January 2019, the line was extended one station to Beichenkejiyuanbei. On 7 December 2021, the line was extended one station to Liqizhuangnan.

Stations (northwest to southwest)

References

Tianjin Metro lines
Railway lines opened in 2018